The 1978 U.S. Pro Indoor was a men's tennis tournament played on indoor carpet courta  at the Spectrum in Philadelphia, Pennsylvania in the United States. The tournament was organized by the World Championship Tennis (WCT) and was part of the 1978 Colgate-Palmolive Grand Prix circuit. It was the 11th edition of the tournament and was held from January 23 through January 29, 1978. First-seeded Jimmy Connors won the singles title and the accompanying $35,000 first-prize money.

Finals

Singles

 Jimmy Connors defeated  Roscoe Tanner 6–2, 6–4, 6–3
 It was Connors' 1st title of the year and the 75th of his career.

Doubles

 Bob Hewitt /  Frew McMillan defeated  Vitas Gerulaitis /  Sandy Mayer 6–4, 6–4
 It was Hewitt's 1st title of the year and the 45th of his career. It was McMillan's 1st title of the year and the 50th of his career.

Points and prize money

Point distribution

Prize money

References

External links
 International Tennis Federation (ITF) tournament details

U.S. Pro Indoor
U.S. Pro Indoor
U.S. Professional Indoor
U.S. Professional Indoor
U.S. Professional Indoor